Group D of the 2021 Africa Cup of Nations took place from 11 to 19 January 2022. The group consisted of Egypt, Guinea-Bissau, Nigeria and Sudan.

Nigeria and Egypt as the top two teams advanced to the round of 16.

Teams

Notes

Standings

Matches

Nigeria vs Egypt

Sudan vs Guinea-Bissau

Nigeria vs Sudan

Guinea-Bissau vs Egypt

Guinea-Bissau vs Nigeria

Egypt vs Sudan

References

External links
 

2021 Africa Cup of Nations